Cameron James Merchant (born 4 January 1984) is an Australian cricketer living in Sydney.

Career
After a Second XI career in Australia, moved to New Zealand to play first class cricket for Northern Districts from 2007. A left-handed batsman and occasional right-arm off-break bowler, Merchant continually alternated between Northern Districts' First and Second XIs into the 2009 season. During his career, he has scored more than 1,000 runs in First and Second XI cricket, including two centuries and five half-centuries. He was formerly a professional at the Toronto Cricket Club in Canada.

Merchant is now the stand-in first grade captain of Manly Warringah District Cricket Club in Sydney Grade Cricket.

Personal life
In 2019, he appeared on the Australian version of Married at First Sight, where he ‘married’ 36-year-old Jules Robinson in an episode originally aired on 28 January 2019. They legally married in November 2019, and their first child, Oliver Chase Merchant, was born on October 3, 2020.

Notes

External links

1984 births
Cricketers from Sydney
Living people
Australian cricketers
Northern Districts cricketers
Wellington cricketers
Participants in Australian reality television series